The 2014 Bord na Móna Walsh Cup was the 52nd staging of the Walsh Cup since its establishment in 1954. Kilkenny beat Dublin by 0-24 to 1-7 to claim their 19th Walsh cup title.

Fixtures

Preliminary round
Offaly 1-17 Antrim 0-14 - 11 January	
NUI Galway 1-17 Laois 1-14 - 12 January 	
UCD 1-11 Carlow 0-13 - 12 January 	
DIT 3-17 Westmeath 4-12 - 12 January

Quarter-finals
Wexford 4-22 NUI Galway 0-07 -18 January
Galway 1-14 Offaly 1-13 - 19 January	
Kilkenny 5-23 DIT 1-09 - 19 January	
Dublin 2-20 UCD 2-15 - 21 January

Semi-finals
Dublin 1-15 Wexford 1-14 - 26 January	
Kilkenny 1-24 Galway 0-15 - 26 January

Final

References

External links
2014 Walsh Cup Results

Walsh
Walsh Cup (hurling)